HMS Argo was a 28-gun sixth-rate frigate of the Royal Navy.

Construction

Argo was a 28-gun sixth-rate, one of 19 vessels forming part of the Coventry class of frigates.

The frigate was named after the Argo, the ship from Greek mythology upon which Jason and the Argonauts sailed from Iolcos to Colchis to retrieve the Golden Fleece. The Navy's choice of this name followed a trend initiated in 1748 by John Montagu, 4th Earl of Sandwich, in his capacity as First Sea Lord, of using figures from classical antiquity as descriptors for naval vessels. A total of six Coventry-class vessels were named in this manner; a further ten were named after geographic features including regions, English or Irish rivers, or towns.

In sailing qualities Argo was broadly comparable with French frigates of equivalent size, but with a shorter and sturdier hull and greater weight in her broadside guns. She was also comparatively broad-beamed with ample space for provisions and the ship's mess, and incorporating a large magazine for powder and round shot. Taken together, these characteristics would enable Argo to remain at sea for long periods without resupply. She was also built with broad and heavy masts, which balanced the weight of her hull, improved stability in rough weather and made her capable of carrying a greater quantity of sail. The disadvantages of this comparatively heavy design were a decline in manoeuvrability and slower speed when sailing in light winds.

Her designated complement was 200, comprising two commissioned officers  a captain and a lieutenant  overseeing 40 warrant and petty officers, 91 naval ratings, 38 Marines and 29 servants and other ranks. Among these other ranks were four positions reserved for widow's men  fictitious crew members whose pay was intended to be reallocated to the families of sailors who died at sea.

Naval career
Argo was commissioned into the Royal Navy in October 1758, during Britain's Seven Years' War with France and Spain. After receiving stores, guns and crew she was out to sea in late January 1759 under the command of Captain John Tinker, and was assigned to the British squadron blockading the French-held port of Dunkirk. Tinker departed the vessel in July 1759 and was replaced by a more junior officer, Commander Walter Griffith.

She took part in the expedition against Manila. In a two-hour action on 31 October 1762, Argo and the  fourth-rate 60-gun  captured the Spanish galleon , loaded with cargo valued at $1.5 million.

Notes

References

Bibliography

External links
 
 Argo at Ships of the Old Navy website

Frigates of the Royal Navy
1758 ships